James Hall Anderson (November 12, 1878 – 1936) was an American politician who served as the seventh Lieutenant Governor of Delaware, from January 20, 1925, to January 15, 1929, under Governor Robert P. Robinson.

External links
 Delaware's Lieutenant Governors

Lieutenant Governors of Delaware
1878 births
1936 deaths